"Silver Tree Top School for Boys" is a song written by David Bowie. It was recorded by beat group The Riot Squad featuring lead vocals by "Croak" Prebble, though it wasn't released until 2012 on the LP The Last Chapter: Mods & Sods, and as an EP circa 2016 by Acid Jazz Records. Bowie himself recorded two versions of the song, neither of which has been released.

Most notably the track was covered by Glasgow beat group, The Beatstalkers, with Bowie on backing vocals.

It was also recorded and released by the band Slender Plenty in 1967 on Polydor Records.

References

External links
 
 Page with links to both versions on MP3

1967 singles
David Bowie songs
Songs written by David Bowie
1967 songs
CBS Records singles